Man's Lust for Gold is a 1912 American short silent drama film directed by D. W. Griffith and starring Blanche Sweet.

Cast
 Blanche Sweet - The Prospector's Daughter
 Robert Harron - The Prospector's Son
 Frank Opperman - The Claim Jumper
 Charles Hill Mailes - The Mexican
 William J. Butler - The Prospector
 William A. Carroll - Among the Indians (as William Carroll)
 Jack Pickford - Among the Indians

See also
 D. W. Griffith filmography
 Blanche Sweet filmography

References

External links

1912 films
Silent American drama films
1912 short films
American silent short films
American black-and-white films
1912 drama films
Films directed by D. W. Griffith
1910s American films
1910s English-language films
American drama short films